Family Z is a turbocharged common rail diesel engine produced by General Motors Korea since 2010. It replaced VM Motori RA 420 diesel engine in a number of GM applications, such as the diesel versions of vehicles sold as Chevrolet made for North America, Daewoo made for Korea, Opel made for Europe and Holden made for Australia.

Compression ratio is 16.5:1.

For 2012, compression ration is reduced to 16.3:1, and a new intake port increases air flow and swirl control, improving nitrogen oxide emissions and performance.

Chevrolet Captiva/Opel Antara

Chevrolet Cruze

Chevrolet Malibu

Chevrolet Orlando

See also
Circle L engine
JTD engine
List of GM engines

References

External links
 

Family Z

Straight-four engines
Gasoline engines by model